María Jesús Maldonado Maira (born 13 August 1997) is a Chilean field hockey player.

Maldonado made her international debut for the Chile senior team in 2017 at a test series in Cape Town, South Africa. 

Maldonado made her junior debut at the 2016 Pan-Am Junior Championship, where the team won a bronze medal. From this tournament, the team qualified for the 2016 Junior World Cup where Maldonado also represented Chile.

Maldonado was part of the Chile team at the 2017 Pan American Cup. At the tournament, the team recorded a historic 4–3 victory over the United States.

At the 2018 South American Games in Cochabamba, Bolivia, Maldonado represented Chile in the women's hockey tournament where the team won a bronze medal.

Her brother, José, also plays hockey and is a member of the Chilean men's national team.

References

1997 births
Living people
Chilean female field hockey players
South American Games bronze medalists for Chile
South American Games medalists in field hockey
Competitors at the 2018 South American Games
Pan American Games competitors for Chile
Field hockey players at the 2019 Pan American Games
20th-century Chilean women
21st-century Chilean women